The Daily Tribune is an English-language broadsheet publication in the Philippines. Its office is in the 3450 Concept Building, Florida Street, Makati, Metro Manila, Philippines. 

The Daily Tribune, as it was called then, was founded on February 1, 2000, by a group of journalists from the then-defunct The Philippine Post led by then-Editor-in-Chief and Founding Chairman Ninez Cacho-Olivares. On June 1, 2018, Concept and Information Group, publisher of the online Concept News Central, acquired the paper from Cacho-Olivares. With the change of hands, "The" from The Daily Tribune has been dropped.

History 
On February 24, 2006, the Tribune was raided by the Philippine National Police at the height of the State of Emergency imposed by Arroyo. The police presence remained in the paper's office until the State of Emergency was lifted on March 4, 2006. The paper continued to publish normally, making defiant statements throughout. Ninez Cacho-Olivarez, the paper's publisher, claimed that some of her reporters were practising self-censorship, but her own publishing decisions were unaffected. She received substantial publicity and her circulation expanded significantly during the crisis; however, she lost many advertisers who were intimidated by the unstable political situation. The Tribune is now said to face sedition charges, and it is unclear whether they will be in any way effective against the newspaper.

Libel suits
Judge Winlove Dumayas of Regional Trial Court Branch 59, Makati on June 5, 2008, found Cacho-Olivarez, publisher of The Daily Tribune, guilty of libel and sentenced her to a minimum of six months and a maximum of two years imprisonment. She was also ordered to pay ₱5 million (US$ 113,636) in moral damages and ₱33,732.25 in civil damages, including a libel fine of ₱4,000, for writing a June 23, 2003 column that accused then-Ombudsman Simeón Marcelo of colluding with the supposedly influential law firm, Villaraza, Cruz, Marcelo & Angangco in the Ninoy Aquino International Airport Terminal 3 deal. Villaraza, Cruz, Marcelo & Angangco (colloquially known as 'The Firm') stated that it will prosecute 47 more libel suits against the publisher of The Daily Tribune.

In February 2006, the office of The Daily Tribune was searched by police during a plot to topple the Arroyo government that resulted in the imposition of the State of Emergency.

On February 24, 2021, Ramon "Tats" Suzara, the president of Philippine National Volleyball Federation, Inc. (PNVFI) and former COO of the Philippine SEA Games Organizing Committee (Phisgoc), sued 17 staff of the paper, including its owner Willie Fernandez and managing editor Aldrin Cardona, for cyber libel.

References

External links

Daily Tribune article on lifting of state of emergency

Daily Tribune
Companies based in Manila
Daily newspapers published in the Philippines